Zack Mwekassa (born 20 January 1984) is a Congolese boxer and kickboxer who fights in GLORY. He is a former Interim Glory Light Heavyweight Champion

As of 1 October 2017, he is ranked the #4 light-heavyweight in the world by CombatPress.com.

Biography
Mwekassa is the son of a chemist and his two brothers are lawyers.  In addition to his fighting career, he is trained as a computer network engineer.  He and his family were displaced from their native DR Congo during the Second Congo War that began in 1998.

Career

Boxing
Mwekassa began his professional boxing career at the age of 22 in 2006 in South Africa.  In the first 2 years of his career, he amassed an undefeated streak of 8-0 with all but one of the wins coming by way of TKO or KO.  He experienced his first losses back-to-back in 2008 and 2009, before going on another 5-0 undefeated streak.

Kickboxing
Mwekassa began training in South Africa in 2003 with elite kickboxers, including the late Mike Bernardo. His trainers intended him for the K-1 circuit but the opportunities were scarce, so he moved into professional boxing in 2006.

In 2014, Mwekassa resurrected his interest in kickboxing.  He saw GLORY on television and approached the company about fighting for them.  He soon found himself scheduled to face popular MMA and kickboxing fighter Pat Barry at Glory 16: Denver. In what many considered a shocking upset, he knocked out Barry with an incredible uppercut in the first round.

Mwekassa returned to the Glory ring on November 7, 2014 at Glory 18: Oklahoma.  He was part of a four-man, one-night tournament to decide the next Light Heavyweight title contender.  Mwekassa started in impressive fashion as he knocked out Brian Collette in the semifinals.  In the finals, he faced Saulo Cavalari.  After a competitive back-and-forth two rounds, Mwekassa lost in the third round due to a head kick.

Mwekassa had a rematch with Cavalari for the vacant Glory Light Heavyweight Championship at Bellator MMA & Glory: Dynamite 1 on September 19, 2015.  He lost the fight via  majority decision.

He fought Mourad Bouzidi for the interim Glory Light Heavyweight title. He defeated Bouzidi by a first round TKO. Mwekassa fought the reigning Glory champion Artem Vakhitov during Glory 35, losing by TKO in the third round.

Titles 
WBF International Cruiserweight Title
ABU all Africa heavyweight title
Interim Glory Light Heavyweight Championship (1 time)

Professional boxing record

Kickboxing record (Incomplete) 

|-
|-  bgcolor="#FFBBBB"
| 2016-11-05 || Loss ||align=left| Artem Vakhitov || Glory 35: Nice || Nice, France || TKO (3 knockdowns) || 2 || 2:23 || 15–4–0
|-
! style=background:white colspan=9 |
|-
|-  bgcolor="#CCFFCC" 
| 2016-06-25 || Win ||align=left| Mourad Bouzidi || Glory 31: Amsterdam || Amsterdam, Netherlands || TKO (3 knockdowns) || 1 || 1:47 || 15–3–0
|-
! style=background:white colspan=9 |
|-
|-  bgcolor="#CCFFCC" 
| 2016-04-16 || Win ||align=left| Zinedine Hameur-Lain || Glory 29: Copenhagen || Copenhagen, Denmark || Decision (unanimous) || 3 || 3:00 || 14–3–0
|-
|-  bgcolor="#FFBBBB"
| 2015-09-19 || Loss ||align=left| Saulo Cavalari || Bellator MMA & Glory: Dynamite 1 || San Jose, California, USA || Decision (majority) || 5 || 3:00 || 13–3–0
|-
! style=background:white colspan=9 |
|-
|-  bgcolor="#CCFFCC" 
| 2015-06-05 || Win ||align=left| Carlos Brooks || Glory 22: Lille || Lille, France || KO (left hook) || 1 || 1:58 || 13–2–0
|-
|-  bgcolor="#FFBBBB"
| 2014-11-07 || Loss ||align=left| Saulo Cavalari || Glory 18: Oklahoma, Final || Oklahoma City, Oklahoma, USA || KO (high kick) || 3 || 0:20 || 12–2–0
|-
! style=background:white colspan=9 |
|-  bgcolor="#CCFFCC"
| 2014-11-07 || Win ||align=left| Brian Collette || Glory 18: Oklahoma, Semi Finals || Oklahoma City, Oklahoma, USA || KO (left hook) || 2 || 0:45 || 12–1–0
|-  bgcolor="#CCFFCC"
| 2014-05-03 || Win  ||align=left| Pat Barry || Glory 16: Denver, Reserve Match || Broomfield, Colorado, USA || KO (left uppercut) || 1 || 2:33 || 11–1–0
|-
|-
| colspan=9 | Legend:

See also 
List of male kickboxers

References

External links
Profile at GLORY
Boxing Record at BoxRec
Michael Stets (2014-05-02) Volcanoes, snake bites and gun shot and gunshot wounds: A conversation with GLORY 16 heavyweight Zack Mwekessa

1984 births
Living people
Cruiserweight boxers
Heavyweight boxers
Democratic Republic of the Congo male boxers
Southpaw boxers
African Boxing Union champions
Democratic Republic of the Congo male  kickboxers
Heavyweight kickboxers
Glory kickboxers
Sportspeople from Kinshasa